The Icelandic Basketball Association Men's All-Star Game was a basketball exhibition game hosted by the Icelandic Basketball Association (KKÍ). It was held was held periodically until 1988 when it was held annually to 2014 and featured a mix of the countries star players. The first annual All-Star Game was played at the Hlíðarendi on 27 January 1988. It was last held on 24 January 2014 at the Ásvellir stadium.

The teams selections varied from year to year, with sports journalists selecting the teams during the first years while later teams were selected by fans and coaches. The teams buildup also varied, sometimes splitting the players to teams based on geography (Players from Suðurnes or the Capital Region versus the rest of the country) or pitting domestic players against foreign players.

The All-Star day also featured a dunk contest, a three-point contest and a celebrity game.

All-Star Game results
This is a list of each All-Star Game, the venue at which it was played, and the Game MVP.

Source

References

Recurring sporting events established in 1988
Basketball all-star games
Basketball competitions in Iceland
1988 establishments in Iceland